In taxonomy, the Thermococcaceae are a family of the Thermococcales. Almost all species within the three genera of Thermococcaceae were isolated from hydrothermal vents in the ocean.  All are strictly anaerobes.

Phylogeny

References

Further reading

Scientific journals

Scientific books

Scientific databases

External links 

Archaea taxonomic families
Euryarchaeota